A gill is an aquatic respiratory organ.

Gill or Gills may also refer to:

Place names

United Kingdom
Gill (ravine), generic term for a narrow valley in the north of England
Gills, Caithness, a township
The Gill, a nature reserve in Kent

United States
Gill, Colorado, an unincorporated community
Gill, Massachusetts, a town
Gill, South Dakota, a ghost town
Gill, Texas, an unincorporated community
Gill, West Virginia, an unincorporated community and former railroad town
Gills, Virginia, an unincorporated community

Elsewhere
Gill (lunar crater), the Moon
Gill (Martian crater), Mars
Gill, Ludhiana, India

People
Gill (name), a given name or surname

Arts and entertainment

Fictional characters and elements
Gill (Kim Possible), a character in the Kim Possible animated series
Gill (Street Fighter), a character in the Street Fighter video game series
Gill, the unit of currency in the Final Fantasy games
Gill, a moorish idol fish character in the Finding Nemo franchise

Other arts and entertainment
Gill, a webcomic by Norm Feuti
The Gills, an indie rock/post-rock band featured on Guitar Hero Live with "Rubberband"

Other uses 
Gill (unit), a unit of volume
Gill (automobile), a British microcar
Gill (publisher), Irish publisher established in 1856 based in Park West, Dublin
Gill (spinning), a machine for heckling flax
Gill, a vector-image program, a fork of which became Sodipodi
Lamella (mycology) or gill, a papery rib under a mushroom cap
The Gills, nickname of Gillingham Football Club in England

See also 

Gil (disambiguation)
Jil, Armenia